Xultún is a large Maya archaeological site located 40 km northeast of Tikal and 8 km south of the smaller Preclassic site of San Bartolo in northern Guatemala.

Site
The site, which once supported a considerable population, has a 35 m tall pyramid, two ballcourts, 24 stelae (the last of which, Stele 10, dates to 889), several plazas, and five large water reservoirs (aguadas). Incompletely charted in the 1970s, it is the largest-known Classic Maya site that has yet to be archaeologically investigated. Nearby sites include Chaj K’e’k Cué, believed to be the residential area of the Xultún elite; Isla Oasis; and Las Minas. The latter sites contain large limestone quarries.

Proyecto Regional Arqueológico San Bartolo-Xultun (English: San Bartolo-Xultun Regional Archaeological Project) (PRASBX) has been investigating this site and the nearby site of San Bartolo since 2001. The project currently (as of 2022) operates under the directorship of Dr. Heather Hurst and Boris Beltrán.

Recent discoveries
Since 2008, excavations in Xultun have revealed several unusual features.

Three Astrologers
One of the unusual features is a Late-Classic room (labeled 10K2) with murals on three sides, showing three dark seated characters with large mitres signalling their priestly function (west wall); a kneeling official extending a stylus to the seated king, Yax We'nel Chan K'inich (north wall); and three other characters, together with unique Maya calendar notations chiefly relating to lunar astrology (northeast and east walls). Most of the characters bear hieroglyphic titles, some of these reminiscent of the senior-junior rankings of the traditionalist Maya civil-religious hierarchy. The lunar notations strongly recall much later calculations found in the Dresden Codex.

Temple of the Royal Jaguar Cult
Another important feature, described by William Saturno in a 2014 presentation, is a building complex called 'Los Árboles', dating to the Early Classic. Its front is decorated with complicated stucco imagery relating to the royal cult of the jaguar, also in evidence on several of the site's stelas. This cult was apparently associated with the dismemberment (imagined or real) of human victims. At the same time, there is a double reference to a place of origins (7 k'an - 9 imix), with the numbers personified by their respective jaguar-related patrons.

Sweatbath Goddess 
In 2012, an Early-Classic sweatbath nicknamed 'Los Sapos' (The Toads) was excavated, a part of a residential complex (Structure 12F-5). Around a small door in its northern facade, a stucco decoration in low relief was laid free of a crouching female person showing amphibian or reptilian hands and feet, and with amphibians, possibly toads, contained within the arms and legs. The head, originally over the door, was missing, so that the age and human aspect of the amphibian woman could not be determined. Nonetheless, she has been suggested to represent the aged midwife goddess, Ix Chel.

History
Up to now (2017), the dynastical history of the important kingdom of Xultun - which has its own emblem glyph - is not well known and can only very partially be reconstructed from information on the site's heavily eroded stelas and from the inscriptions of other kingdoms with which it interacted, such as Caracol, Tikal and Naranjo. A fuller picture is nonetheless possible by taking into account data from the archaeology of the wider Xultun - San Bartolo habitational area. The kingdom's Classic importance is reflected by its role as a center of refined painting 'schools'.

References

Bibliography
 Clarke, Mary, A Preliminary Iconographic Analysis of a Possible Early Classic-Period Sweatbath at the Maya Site of Xultun. Bachelor Thesis, Savannah College of Art and Design, Georgia 2013 (http://www.maryclarkearchaeology.com/uploads/5/2/2/7/52270019/clarke_arth499_thesis.pdf). 
 Garrison, Thomas G., and David Stuart, "Un análisis preliminar de las inscripciones que se relacionan con Xultun, Petén, Guatemala." In XVII Simposio de Investigaciones Arqueológicas en Guatemala, 2003: 851–862. 
 Garrison, Thomas G., and Nicholas P. Dunning, "Settlement, Environment, and Politics in the San Bartolo - Xultun Territory, El Petén, Guatemala." Latin American Antiquity 20(4), 2009: 525–552.
 Krempel, Guido, and Sebastian Matteo, "Painting styles of the north-eastern Petén from a local perspective: The palace schools of Yax We'en Chan K'inich, Lord of Xultun." [Krakow] Contributions in New World Archeology 3 (2012): 135–172.
 Prager, Christian, Wagner E., Matteo S. et al., "A Reading for the Xultun Toponymic Title as B'aax (Tuun) Witz 'Ajaw «Lord of the B'aax-(Stone) Hill»". Mexicon Vol. XXXII Nr. 4 (2010):74-77.
 Rossi, Franco, David Stuart, and William Saturno, "Una Exploración Epigráfica del Sitio Xultún." XXVIII Simposio de Investigaciones Arqueológicas en Guatemala, 2014, editado por B. Arroyo, L. Méndes Salinas, L. Paiz. Guatemala: Ministerio de Cultura y Deportes, IDAEH, and Asociación Tikal, 2015:663—674.
 Saturno, William (30 de enero de 2014). «Sembrando la raíz de la dinastía: conjunto los Árboles, Xultun, Guatemala». (video) Guatemala: Universidad Francisco Marroquín.
 Saturno, William, Franco Rossi, David Stuart, and Heather Hurst, "A Maya curia regis: Evidence for a hierarchical specialist order at Xultun, Guatemala". Ancient Mesoamerica 2017: 1-18.
 Zender, Marc, and Joel Skidmore, "Unearthing the Heavens: Classic Maya Murals and Astronomical Tables at Xultun, Guatemala". 2012 Mesoweb: www.mesoweb.com/reports/Xultun.html.

External links
 Nevermind the Apocalypse: Earliest Mayan Calendar Found
 Mesoamerican Archaeoastronomy

Maya sites in Petén Department
Archaeological sites in Guatemala
Former populated places in Guatemala